Jennifer Vel is a  Seychelles politician and economist. She is a member of the National Assembly of Seychelles.  She is a member of the Seychelles People's Progressive Front, and was first elected to the Assembly in 2007.

References
Member page on Assembly website

Year of birth missing (living people)
Living people
Members of the National Assembly (Seychelles)
People from Pointe La Rue
Seychellois economists
United Seychelles Party politicians
Seychellois women in politics
21st-century women politicians